This is an incomplete List of ghost towns in Wyoming.  Towns marked with the symbol "†" are small but populated communities (50 or fewer residents) that have dwindled in size from their peak, and have significant sections that are abandoned.

 †Atlantic City, in Fremont County.
 †Alva, in Crook County.
 Baker Town
 Barrett Town
 Bear Rock
 Benton
 Bessemer
 †Bosler, in Albany County.
 Bryan, in Sweetwater County.
 Buckhorn
 Buford, in Albany County.
 Cambria, in Weston County.
 Canyon Springs
 Carbon Timber Town
 Clifton
 The Duncan
 Empire
 Forest City
 Fort Steele
 Gebo, in Hot Springs County.
 Hecla, in Laramie County.
 Horton
 †Jeffrey City, in Fremont County.
 Jireh
 Kane, in Big Horn County.
 Linwood (on the Wyoming-Utah state line)
 Lewiston
 Lost Springs, in Converse County.
 Manhattan
 Mineral Hill
 Miner's Delight, in Fremont County.
 Moskee
 Pacific Springs
 Piedmont, in Uinta County.
 Rocky Ford 
 Sage, in Lincoln County.
 †South Pass City, in Fremont County.
 Sherman, in Albany County.
 Spencer
 Sunrise, in Platte County.
 Table Rock, in Sweetwater County.
 Tubb Town, in Weston County.
 †Van Tassell, in Niobrara County.
 †Walcott, in Carbon County.
 Welcome
 Whoop-Up

Notes and references

 
Wyoming
Ghost towns